Scouts Musulmans de France (Muslim Scouts of France, SMF) is a French Muslim Scouting organization for boys and girls between 8 and 21 years old with about 1,000 members. It was founded in 1990 by Sheikh Khaled Bentounès, the spiritual leader of the Sufi Alawiya Brotherhood, and is headquartered in Noisy-le-Grand. It is part of the Fédération du Scoutisme Français (Federation of French Scouting) and through this a member of both the World Association of Girl Guides and Girl Scouts and the World Organization of the Scout Movement. It also is a member of the International Union of Muslim Scouts.

Younes Aberkane, the father of Idriss Aberkane, was one of the first leaders of the SMF.  Younes Aberkane later became a director for Terre d’Europe, a similar organization.

Emblem
The badge of the SMF consists of a red fleur de lis for allegiance to the Scout movement, resting on a  green trefoil, a sign of belonging to the Guide movement, the 5 pointed star in the centre is for the Muslim belief of the association.

Levels
There are four sections in the organisation:
Voyageurs and Voyageuses are between 8 and 12 years old and belong to a Cercle.
Éclaireurs and Éclaireuses are between 11 and 15 years old and belong to a Troupe.
Pionniers and Pionnières are between 14 and 18 years old and belong to a Poste.
Compagnons and Compagnonnes are between 17 and 21 years old and belong to a Relais.

See also
Scouting in France

References

Scouting and Guiding in France
World Association of Girl Guides and Girl Scouts member organizations
World Organization of the Scout Movement member organizations
Youth organizations established in 1990